This timeline of the fourth phase of the 2022 Russian invasion of Ukraine covers the period from 10 November 2022, when both Ukrainian counteroffensives ended, to the present day. Starting in October, Russia began a campaign of massive strikes against Ukrainian infrastructure, which continued into the next phase. Russia achieved some advances, starting with the capture of Soledar on 16 January 2023.

This timeline is a dynamic and fluid list, and as such may never satisfy criteria of completeness. Moreover, some events may only be fully understood and/or discovered in retrospect.

November 2022

10 November

Several United States officials announced a $400 million military aid package to Ukraine, including ammunition for the High Mobility Artillery Rocket System (HIMARS), mortars and missiles for the Hawk surface-to-air anti-aircraft system, and, for the first time, Avenger air defense systems.

11 November

Ukrainian troops entered the city of Kherson with little fighting, while the front line reached the western bank of the Dnieper River.

14 November
The United Nations General Assembly has passed a resolution that holds Russia responsible for all damage caused to Ukraine by the invasion and demands reparations.

15 November

Russia launched about 85 to 100 missiles at a number of Ukrainian cities. The recent strategic bombing campaign caused severe shortages of electricity and water at multiple cities. According to the Ukrainian Air Force some 77 of 96 Russian missiles were shot down. A Pentagon official claimed the Russian plan was to exhaust the Ukrainian air defences. At one stage some 50 missiles were in combat "within minutes" near the Polish border.

A missile crossed over Polish borders and struck the village of Przewodów, killing two civilians. Top leaders in Poland held an emergency meeting. Initial assessments by the United States found that the missile was likely to have been an air defence missile fired by Ukrainian forces at an incoming Russian missile.

According to Ukraine's Operational Command South, Ukrainian rocket and artillery units attacked Russian positions on the left bank of the Dnipro River and in the area of the Kinburn Spit.

17 November
After the missile strikes, more than 10 million people were without power by 17 November, but a day later Ukrainian officials reported that electricity had already been restored to "nearly 100%" of Ukraine.

According to Ukrainian officials, one of the wrecks of missiles found after a missile attack earlier that day is that of an "X-55/Kh-55" cruise missile. These missiles are apparently incapable of carrying a conventional warhead, but this specific missile had an "imitation block" (model for training) of a nuclear bomb. They believed the missile was meant to help overwhelm Ukraine's missile defenses.

23 November

The European Parliament declared Russia a "state sponsor of terrorism" for the way Russia has systematically attacked civilians and committed war crimes. This declaration is itself symbolic, but calls for more sanctions.

The Russian military has launched 65 to 70 missiles at civilian settlements and energy infrastructure, although 51 of those were said to have been shot down. The attack caused blackouts over much of Ukraine and forced several nuclear power plants to shut down. Much of Moldova was also experiencing blackouts due to the attack-related power grid failure in Ukraine.

25 November
According to U.S. and Ukrainian officials, about 1/3 of Western-supplied artillery is always out of action in Ukraine due to wear-related mechanical problems. The United States European Command is said to have a repair base in Poland, but it is problematic to transport the weapons there from the front.

28 November
The Russian army was actively pushing on both sides of Bakhmut, a city in the immediate vicinity of the front on the Ukrainian side. The Russians were trying to encircle the town, but according to observers, they were making very slow progress, so there was no immediate danger to the settlement and the Russians might not be able to encircle it at the current rate.

29 November
Jens Stoltenberg, the Secretary-General of NATO, made a speech at the meeting of NATO foreign ministers at Bucharest, in which he expressed alliance commitment to support Ukraine for as long as is required, because allowing Russia to win would only embolden Putin. He also promised Ukraine that NATO would one day accept them as a member and that Putin cannot deny sovereign nations the right to make their own sovereign decisions that are not a threat to Russia. He also speculated that the main challenges to Putin are democracy and freedom.

30 November
Ursula von der Leyen, president of the European Commission, speaking in the name of the EU, suggested the creation of a UN court to investigate war crimes committed by Russia. Russia does not recognize the International Criminal Court, so the European Commission has proposed two possible alternative ways to hold Russia accountable: either to create a court that would be set up by international treaties, or to create an international court with a number of judges from several countries. She estimated the war-damage to Ukraine is about 600 billion Euros. She proposed a financial plan to help pay for this. She pointed out that the EU has frozen 300 billion Euros worth of Russian central bank reserves and 20 billion Euros worth of money belonging to Russias oligarchs, which she suggested should be invested. The investments could be given to Ukraine when sanctions are lifted. The original statement by Ursula von der Leyen included a claim that 100,000 Ukrainian soldiers and 20,000 Ukrainian civilians have been killed so far in the war. This angered unspecified Ukrainian military officials, who are reported to have said that the death toll is classified information. In response, the European Commission edited the video of von der Leyen's speech to remove this information. Official publications of the text of the speech was also edited to omit the numbers.

December 2022

2 December 
Ukrainian Presidential Advisor Mykhailo Podolyak claims that 10–13,000 Ukrainian soldiers have been killed since 24 February, with a figure last given in August of 9,000.

5 December
Explosions were reported at two Russian airbases: the one at Engels-2 reportedly damaged two Tu-95s according to Baza; the other at the Dyagilevo military airbase near Ryazan, destroyed a fuel truck and killed three, injuring five. Russian Minisitry of Defence stated Ukraine attempted to strike Russia's long-range aviation bombers with Soviet-made jet drones, and that the drones were subsequently shot down at low altitude when approaching the air bases. The attack involved the use of Tu-141 drones that were taken out of storage. They appear to have been fitted with improvised explosives. While no significant damage or burn marks are visible on satellite images of the Engels-2 air base, at least one Tu-22M3 bomber was visually confirmed to be slightly damaged at the Dyagilevo air base.

Following the attacks, Russia launched a renewed wave of missile strikes against Ukraine, consisting of about 70 cruise misilles. Ukraine claimed 60 missiles have been shot down, Russia claimed 17 targets have been hit on the ground. As a result, a missile fell again within the borders of Moldova, near the city of Briceni.

6 December
The Russian governor of Kursk, Roman Starovoyt, claimed that a Ukrainian drone attack destroyed an oil tank near an airbase. No reports of casualties and the fire was under control. No comment from Ukraine on these claims.

7 December

President Putin has acknowledged that the "special military operation" is taking longer than expected, however the Russian nuclear arsenal is preventing the conflict from escalating. As in June 2022, he made another reference to the expansion of the Russian Empire by Peter the Great.

9 December
Putin revealed that he is considering adopting the concept of the "preemptive strike" from the U.S. According to him, the U.S. openly discussed this policy some years ago, but currently Russia is only just thinking about it. A few hours after Putin's statement, Jens Stoltenberg, general secretary of NATO, warned that there's a real possibility of a major war between Russia and NATO.

Russia re-occupied the previously liberated Dnieper river island of Ostriv Velykyi Potomkin close to Kherson. This was confirmed by presidential advisor Oleksii Arestovych and Lieutenant Colonel Konstiantyn Mashovets, as well as some unofficial Russian sources. The General Staff of the Ukrainian Armed Forces claimed on 15 December that Russia had begun the process of forcibly deporting the island's civilian residents.

10 December
Russia used Iranian-made drones to hit two energy facilities in Odesa, leaving all non-critical infrastructure in the Ukrainian port without power and 1.5 million people without electricity.

Ukraine launched a missile attack on the Russian-occupied city of Melitopol including at a Russian military barracks; according to Melitopol's Russia-installed administrators, four missiles hit the city, killing two people. In addition, explosions were reported in Donetsk and Crimea.

11 December
Ukraine President Zelenskyy said that Russian forces have turned the city of Bakhmut into "burned ruins".

12 December
President Zelenskyy appealed to the G7 for tanks, artillery and long range weapons. In response, the G7 pledged to meet Ukraine's requirements.

Luhansk's exiled Governor Serhiy Haidai claimed that Ukraine's armed forces killed personnel from the Wagner Group, a private military company in the Luhansk Region.

The UK sanctioned Russian military commanders for missile attacks and Iranian businessmen for the production and supply of military drones. EU sanctioned 20 individuals and one entity of Iran over human rights abuse. Ministers of the European Union of Foreign Affairs have also claimed that they have proofs to support Iran supplying Shahed-136 drones to Russia despite denials from both countries.

13 December
Robert Magowan, a British lieutenant general and former commander of the Royal Marines, revealed that the Royal Marines have several times been involved in "secret operations" in Ukraine, in "extremely sensitive context", involving "a high level of political and military risk".

Denis Pushilin, Acting head of Donetsk's People of Republic claimed that half of the Donetsk region is under Russian control.

14 December
Three explosions were heard in the centre of Kyiv; President Zelenskyy claimed that Ukrainian air defence forces shot down 13 Iranian Shahed drones.

Reports emerged that U.S. officials were finalising and preparing to announce a plan to provide Ukraine with the sophisticated Patriot air defence system, agreeing to an urgent request from Ukrainian leaders amid increasing Russian missile attacks against Ukraine's infrastructure. Biden administration was reluctant to deploy the system for months, as a Patriot battery complex would need at least 90 trained troops to operate and maintain it, along with concerns that it would provoke Russia to escalate.

Ukrainian Parliament Commissioner for Human Rights Dmytro Lubinets claimed that a children's torture chamber had been uncovered in Kherson.

Andrii Yermak, Chief of Staff of the Office of the President of Ukraine Volodymyr Zelenskyy, stated that they have released around 64 military personnel and a US Citizen during a prisoner swap deal with Russia.

15 December
Zelenskyy stated that Russia should start to withdraw their troops by Christmas as a step to end the conflict. Russia responded "No Christmas Ceasefire" until Ukraine accepts loss of territory.

The Kyiv School of Economics published a report estimating that, as of November 2022, Russia's invasion had caused $136 billion in direct damage to Ukraine's infrastructure. Energy infrastructure, industry, public, and private enterprises were impacted the most.

USAID delivered four excavators and over 130 generators to Kyiv for use in "boiler houses and heat supply stations" according to mayor Vitali Klitschko.

The recently liberated city of Kherson was entirely without power following recent Russian shelling, which killed at least two people. The Kherson military administration stated that the city was hit 86 times with "artillery, MLRS, tanks, mortars and UAVs," in the past 24 hours.

In the Donbas, Ukrainian forces bombarded Donetsk city in the largest wave of shelling seen since 2014, according to mayor Alexey Kulemzin.

Volker Türk, the United Nations High Commissioner for Human Rights, published a detailed summary of 441 killings including 8 girls during the conflict.

United States had expanded its training to 500 Ukrainians each month at Germany.

16 December

Russia launched around 76 missiles on Kyiv, Kharkiv, Poltava, and Kremenchuk, destroying infrastructure. Reports suggest at least four were killed in Kryvyi Rih. These 76 missiles were fired at 9 power plants; Ukraine claims 60 were intercepted.

A Ukrainian strike on the village of Lantrativka, in Luhansk Oblast, officially kills 11 Russian trench diggers, but eyewitnesses claim the number is 84 killed.

17 December
Missiles were launched targeting infrastructure on Kyiv, Kharkiv, Kryvyi Rih and Zaporhizhzhia. Kyiv council member Ksenia Semenova stated that approximately 60% of residents were without power and 70% were without water. Ukraine restored power and water to approximately 6 million residents in 24 hours. 37 out of the 40 missiles fired at Kyiv were intercepted.

Russia started a new campaign on TV to recruit more soldiers. In one advertisement, some men leave for Georgia. An old woman drops her groceries and men who have not left help her pick them up. She then says: "The boys have left, the men stayed."

18 December
The Russian government recruited musicians to boost morale. The so-called "front-line creative brigade" will be made up from mobilised soldiers and musicians who have volunteered.

19 December

According to Ukrainian Air Force, Russia attacked Ukraine's infrastructure with 35 Iranian kamikaze drones, 30 of which are said to be shot down. 23 of the drones attacked Kyiv (according to the city officials, 18 of them were shot down). An infrastructure facility was damaged, leaving three areas in Kyiv without power supply. Energy shortages caused interruptions in heat and water supply. Mykolaiv and Kherson regions were also attacked. Building of Kherson Oblast State Administration was partially destroyed.

20 December
President Putin stated that the situation is "extremely difficult" in the four areas of Russia-annexed Ukraine. Putin ordered the Federal Security Services to step up surveillance at the country's borders to combat "emergence of new threats" from abroad and traitors.

President Zelenskyy visited the Bakhmut region.

Russian energy exporter Gazprom said that despite a fatal explosion at the Urengoy–Pomary–Uzhhorod pipeline they were able to supply gas to their customers using parallel pipelines without any shortages.

21 December
The United States is aiming to provide military aid of $1.8 billion USD including the Patriot missile system.

Ukraine President Zelenskyy met United States President Biden during his 2022 visit and addressed a joint session of the US Congress after Speaker of the house Nancy Pelosi invited President Zelenskyy.

22 December
United States National Security Council spokesperson John Kirby estimated that the Wagner Group deployed 40,000 mercenaries of recruited convicts and 10,000 mercenaries of contractors. The North Korean Foreign ministry denied US claims that it was supplying "infantry rockets and missiles into Russia".

Speaking to reporters, President Putin referred to the conflict in Ukraine as a "war" and also said that the U.S. Patriot system is "old and does not work as well as the Russian S-300 missile system". Critics stated that referring to the conflict as a "war" is considered a crime under a censorship law signed in March 2022, with a penalty of up to 15 years in prison, and called for the prosecution of President Putin.

Ukrainian game developer Volodymyr Yezhov is killed defending Bakhmut

23 December 
The Netherlands pledged up to 2.5 billion euros to help Ukraine in 2023.  This aid will pay for military equipment and rebuilding critical infrastructure. President Zelenskyy thanked them for this pledge.

24 December

Russian forces shelled Kherson leaving 10 dead and 55 injured according to the Ukrainian President and officials. President Zelenskyy stated that the shelling first hit a department store and then a market.

The Russian army has placed three battalions near the Ukraine border, inside Belarus. The Ukrainian military has made note of this and considered further securing the northern border.

Pavel Antov, a Russian billionaire and member of the United Russia party for a regional parliament, died after a fall from a hotel in India. Described as a "sausage magnate", Antov is the 12th high-profile Russian businessman to have died due to suicide or an accident. Having previously made anti-war comments on WhatsApp, he claimed it was due to a "technical error". Another Russian, and friend of Antov's, Vladimir Budanov also died at the same hotel just two days before.

25 December
President Putin stated that Russia is ready for negotiation, but that Kyiv and its Western backers refused to engage in talks. Turkish president Recep Tayyip Erdoğan accused the West of only provoking the war in Ukraine, rather than mediating it. Erdogan cited the Black Sea Grain Initiative as an example of Turkey's role in mediating.

26 December
Russia claims to have shot down a Ukrainian drone near the Engels-2 (air base). The governor of the region, Roman Busargin, reported no damage to "civilian infrastructure". Three people from the "technical staff" were killed by falling drone wreckage. According to the Russian defence ministry, "a Ukrainian unmanned aerial vehicle was shot down at low altitude while approaching the Engels military airfield in the Saratov region." Ukrainian and Russian social media accounts report a number of bombers have been destroyed; however Reuters couldn't confirm these claims.

Russia's Federal Security Service (FSB) reported four Ukrainian saboteurs were killed by landmines during a failed cross-border operation into the Bryansk region. The Ukrainians were wearing winter camouflage and carrying German SIG Sauer firearms, navigation equipment, and four bombs.

Ukraine has asked the United Nations to expel Russia from the United Nations Security Council, claiming that Russia has illegally taken the seat of the USSR and is a hostile nation that wages illegal wars.

27 December
Russian Foreign Minister Sergey Lavrov stated that Ukraine must accept Moscow's peace demands: "Our proposals for the demilitarisation and denazification of the territories controlled by the regime, the elimination of threats to Russia's security emanating from there, including our new lands, are well known to the enemy. The point is simple: Fulfil them for your own good. Otherwise, the issue will be decided by the Russian army."

Russia banned crude oil sales to price cap nations which includes G7, European Union, and Australia. President Putin issued a decree that ban will be effective from 1 February 2023 up to 5 months and stated that sale ban could be lifted to individuals through "specific reasons".

28 December
The Department of Foreign Affairs and Trade confirmed the death of Sage O’Donnell, the fourth Australian to die fighting for Ukraine.

Russian health ministry will permit Russian soldiers who had been fighting in Ukraine to have their sperm frozen in cryobanks for free.

Chief of the Main Intelligence Directorate of Ukraine, Kyrylo Budanov said that at present, neither Ukraine nor Russian forces were able to advance.

29 December
The Indian Police launched a criminal investigation into the deaths of two Russians in India, including war critic and billionaire Pavel Antov.

Ukraine Presidential advisor Mykhailo Podolyak stated that over 120 missiles were launched at infrastructure facilities in Kyiv, Kharkiv, Lviv and other cities. Ukraine claimed that 54 of 69 missiles were shot down and three people died in Kyiv; 90% of Lviv and 40% of Kyiv were without power.

Belarus reported that they shot down an S-300 anti-aircraft missile that had been launched targeting rural Belarus.

The Russian regional governor, Roman Busargin, claimed that a Ukrainian drone was shot down near the Engels-2 Air Base with only slight damage to residential housing and no injuries. There were unverified reports on social media of air raid sirens and an explosion.

30 December
Ukrainian army claimed to have shot down 16 drones launched by Russian forces at Kyiv and other cities. Mayor of Kyiv Vitali Klitschko, stated that two were shot down outside Kyiv while five were shot down "over" Kyiv.

President Putin and President Xi Jinping held talks via video link in which the latter reassured the former that he would maintain an "objective and fair stance" regarding the situation, according to CCTV.

31 December
The head of Ukraine's armed forces, Valerii Zaluzhnyi, claimed that air defences had shot down 12 of 20 Russian cruise missiles. Vitaly Klitschko, the Mayor of Kyiv, stated that a series of explosions directed at infrastructure killed at least one person and wounded twenty, including a Japanese journalist. A drone strike on Khmelnytskyi injured two persons.

Russia announced that armed forces fighting in the regions of Donetsk, Luhansk, Kherson and Zaporizhia will have their income tax exempted.

January 2023

1 January

The Ukrainian military claimed to have killed 400 Russian soldiers with another 300 being wounded during a missile attack on Makiivka in occupied Donetsk. Daniil Bezsonov, a senior Russian-backed official, blamed the attack on the "American HIMARS", claiming that some 25 rockets were fired at the region. Russia's Ministry of Defence confirmed that a total of 63 Russian soldiers had died in the attack after 6 rockets had been fired. The barracks was based next to an ammunition dump, according to Russian milbloggers, which may explain the large explosion. Bezsonov has called for the military officers responsible to be "punished". The General Staff of Ukraine claimed 10 vehicles destroyed. On 3 January the Russian Ministry of Defence gave an updated figure of 89 dead.

Ukraine armed forces claimed that they had shot down 45 kamikaze drones. The Russian attack came several hours after the Ukrainian attack on Makiivka. According to the Mayor of Kyiv, one man was injured by falling debris.

Russian Governor Alexander Bogomaz claimed that Ukraine launched a drone attack on an electrical facility in the Klimovsky District.

2 January
According to TASS, Russian forces shot down a Ukrainian drone near the city of Voronezh.

4 January
France announced that it would send AMX-10 RC and ACMAT Bastion to Ukraine.

5 January
Russian Orthodox Church Primate Patriarch Kirill called for a Christmas ceasefire so that people could attend Orthodox Christmas services on 6–7 January. Turkish President Erdogan also called for a "unilateral cease-fire"; afterwards, President Putin ordered Russian armed forces to hold a 36-hour cease-fire for the Russian Orthodox Christmas. Ukraine rejected Russia's cease-fire proposal. The UK MoD said that fighting had "continued at a routine level into the Orthodox Christmas period."

The first group of 24 prisoners recruited by PMC Wagner, fighting in Ukraine, have finished their six months contracts and have been released with full amnesty for their past crimes.

In a joint statement President Biden and Chancellor Scholz announced that the German government had decided to provide Ukraine with a Patriot missile system and 40 Marder Infantry Fighting Vehicles, while the United States government would provide around 50 Bradley Fighting Vehicles.

6 January
The United States Department of Defence awarded a $40 million contract to L3Harris to provide Ukraine with 4 VAMPIRE kits (vehicle-mountable light guided missile system) in mid 2023 and 10 by 2023 year-end.

8 January
The Russian ministry of defence claimed that more than 600 Ukrainian soldiers were killed during the attack on barracks in Kramatorsk. Kramatorsk's Mayor Oleksandr Honcharenko stated that the attack only damaged two buildings and there was no evidence of casualties. A Finnish and more than one Reuters journalist visited the site and found out that an S-300 had struck an empty school building, with no signs of casualties.

9 January

Russia and Ukraine conducted their 36th prisoner swap of the conflict, with each side trading 50 POWs to the other.

Ukraine's Regional prosecutor office claimed that an S-300 fired from Belgorod Oblast hit a market in Shevchenkove, killing two women, wounding a child, and reportedly damaging a shopping centre.

A spokesperson stated that Germany has no plans to provide the Leopard 2 to Ukraine.

10 January
Ukrainian steel production was reduced by about 70% in 2022 as a result of the conflict.

US and Ukrainian officials stated that Russian artillery fire had declined nearly 75% in some places.

The UK says most of Soledar is under Russian control, whereas Wagner claims all.

11 January

Russian Defence Minister Sergei Shoigu appointed Valery Gerasimov in place of Sergey Surovikin as overall commander of the war against Ukraine. Surovikin will serve as Gerasimov's deputy.

Wagner Group claims around 500 Ukrainians were killed during the battle of Soledar.

12 January 
Governor of Donetsk Pavlo Kyrylenko stated that around 100 Russian soldiers had been killed in the Soledar area.

13 January
The Russian Military stated that it captured Soledar, but Ukraine Defence minister Oleksii Reznikov denied that the city had been captured and said the fighting was "very difficult". Governor of Donetsk Pavlo Kyrylenko stated that "559 civilians including 15 children" remained in Soledar and could not be evacuated. President Zelenskyy and Ukrainian Deputy Defense Minister Hanna Maliar announced that pockets of resistance in the city center continues, and that the western portion of the settlement remains in Ukrainian hands. Chief of staff to the President of Ukraine Andriy Yermak stated that "Soledar is a scene of street battles, with neither side really in control of the town." Geolocation based on photos suggested that Ukrainian troops were still defending the north western part of the city.

14 January 

A new wave of Russian missile strikes on several regions of Ukraine. Kyiv's Military administration reported hitting of Kyiv's critical infrastructure. Kharkiv, Odesa and other cities were also hit.

A Russian missile strike partially destroyed an apartment building in Dnipro, killing at least 46 people and injuring 80.

The United Kingdom stated that it will provide Challenger 2 tanks and artillery systems to Ukraine.

15 January 
Armin Papperger, the CEO of German arms manufacturer Rheinmetall, stated that the company would not be able to deliver battle-ready Leopard 2 tanks to Ukraine until 2024.

16 January 

German Defence Minister Christine Lambrecht resigned in part due to blunders over German support for Ukraine.

A grenade exploded in Tonenkoye village's community center, which was used to store ammunition and house Russian soldiers. TASS reported that the RGD-5 grenade explosion in Belgorod Oblast killed 3 soldiers and wounded 16.  Eight soldiers are missing.

Russia had secured control of Soledar after capturing the last industrial zone near mine number 7 which was previously held by Ukrainian troops. Ukraine admitted that they had lost Soledar.

17 January

The US Military stated that Ukrainian soldiers are being trained in the United States on the Patriot Missile system.

Serbian President Aleksandar Vucic condemned PMC Wagner for running a social media campaign calling for Serbian recruits to fight in Ukraine.

18 January
Australian Defence minister Richard Marles stated that Australian Army soldiers will be deployed in the UK to train Ukrainian soldiers in "infantry tactics in an urban, wooded and basic infantry tactics".

20 January
Ukraine Defence Minister Oleksii Reznikov stated that, despite the lack of agreement to export the tanks, Ukrainian soldiers would be trained on Leopard 2 tanks in Poland.

21 January
Russia claimed to conduct a new offensive in Zaporizhzhia Oblast.

22 January
German Foreign Minister Annalena Baerbock stated that Germany would not stand in the way if Poland or other countries provide Leopard 2 tanks.

Russian state media reported that Russia advanced into Orikhiv and Hulyaipol towns in Zaporizhia region.

23 January
Polish Prime Minister Mateusz Morawiecki stated that Poland will provide 14 Leopard tanks to Ukraine regardless of Germany's approval; the next day, Poland officially requested permission to export them. German Defence Minister Boris Pistorius encouraged other countries to provide training on the tanks for Ukrainian soldiers.

French President Emmanuel Macron stated that France would send Leclerc tanks to Ukraine.

Norwegian defence chief General Eirik Kristoffersen stated that around 180,000 Russian soldiers were dead or wounded and there were around 100,000 military casualties and 30,000 civilian dead from Ukraine.

24 January
Several senior and junior ministers resigned from positions in the Ukrainian government, including the deputy head of the President's Office, a deputy Defence Minister, the Deputy Prosecutor-General and the deputy infrastructure minister.

German Chancellor Olaf Scholz agreed to provide Leopard 2 tanks and allowed other countries to do the same. Ukraine senior officials stated that around 100 Leopard 2 tanks from twelve countries are ready to be transferred to Ukraine.

A missile hit a Turkish-owned cargo ship Tuzla and started a fire while at the Port of Kherson. There were no reported casualties.

25 January
The United States is expected to send 31 M1 Abrams tanks to Ukraine and German Chancellor Olaf Scholz agreed to provide 14 Leopard 2A6 tanks to Ukraine. Those tanks, along with the contributions of other nations, will total around 88 Leopard tanks.

26 January

According to Ukraine, 55 missiles were fired at targets in Ukraine, along with another 24 Shahed-136 drones. The Ukrainian Air Force claims to have shot down all of the drones and 47 of the missiles. Including in the attack was a Kh-47 Kinzhal hypersonic missile. Kyiv's mayor said one person had died and two were wounded when an apartment block was hit in the Holosiiv district. All over the country, 11 people were killed and 11 more injured, according to Emergency Service. This has been the 13th mass attack since the invasion began.

28 January
The Ukrainian Ambassador to France, Vadym Omelchenko, said that Ukraine was promised "321 heavy tanks" without detailing the numbers of tanks from the various countries.

30 January
The Australian and French governments have signed an agreement regarding Ukraine. Under the agreement: "France and Australia will jointly supply Ukraine with 155mm shells".

31 January
US President Joe Biden has said no to sending US F-16s to Ukraine after being asked by a reporter. A spokesman for British PM Rishi Sunak has said it is not practical for the UK to supply Ukraine with fighter jets.

Two US government officials said that the US was preparing a $2 billion aid package to Ukraine which includes Ground Launched Small Diameter Bombs with a range of around 150 km (94 miles).

February 2023

1 February

Law enforcement agencies searched the houses of several former Ukrainian officials in an anti-corruption raid.

PMC Wagner have published a photo claiming a capture of what has remained from the depopulated Sakko I Vantsetti village.

2 February 
According to a South Korean news report, North Korea plans to send up to 500 military and police personnel to Russian-occupied Donbass after pulling back on a previous plan to send workers.

Police stated that a Russian missile destroyed an apartment building in the Kramatorsk, killing at least three people and injuring 20 others. EU officals visited Kyiv.

4 February
Ukrainian officials claim to have done another prisoner swap with Russia. They claim 116 Ukrainian POWs have been returned, including Ukrainian soldiers and guerrillas from occupied territories. It also includes the bodies of the two deceased British aid workers killed near Soledar. Chris Parry, aged 28, and Andrew Bagshaw, aged 47. Russian officials claim some 63 soldiers were returned. The deal was in part organised by the United Arab Emirates.

5 February

The Wall Street Journal reported that Russia and Iran plan to build a plant for making improved Shahed 136 drones in Yelabuga, Russia, and make there at least 6,000 drones for the war in Ukraine.

Embargo and price ceilings on Russian oil products, introduced by EU, Australia and G7, came into effect.
	
Russian shelling and rocket strikes damaged houses and civilian infrastructure in Kherson Oblast, Druzhkivka (Donetsk Oblast) and Kharkiv. In addition, the Kharkiv National Academy of Urban Economy was partially destroyed.

8 February
Russian captain Igor Mangushev died from a head wound sustained earlier in February.

9 February
In its latest assessment, the Institute for the Study of War said that Russian forces had begun their next major offensive in the west of eastern Luhansk region, most of which is occupied by Russia.

Dmitry Medvedev, member of Russia's security council, visited the Omsk Transport Engineering Plant (a tank factory) and made a statement, promising to "modernize thousands of tanks" and "increase production of modern tanks" in response to Ukraine receiving western tanks.

Volodymyr Zelenskyy, president of Ukraine, met with the European Council at Brussels and reported to them that his country has intercepted plans by Russian secret services to "destroy" Moldova by arranging some kind of pro-Russia coup. This was also confirmed by Moldovan intelligence.

On 9 February 2023, Ukrainian artillery claims to have destroyed the first BMPT Terminator near Kreminna.

10 February
Seventeen Russian missiles hit Zaporizhzhia in an hour. Other missiles hit Khmelnytskyi, Kharkiv and  Dnipropetrovsk regions, targeting the power grid and forcing emergency blackouts.

Valerii Zaluzhnyi said two Kalibr missiles launched from the Black Sea entered Moldovan airspace before re-entering Ukraine. The Defense Ministry of Moldova confirmed that a missile had crossed its airspace, and summoned the Russian ambassador.

The Ukrainian government claimed to have shot down 61 of the 71 cruise missiles that Russian forces fired at Ukrainian targets, using a mixture of Kh-101, Kh-555 and Kalibr missiles; eight Tu-95 bombers were used as well as elements of the Black Sea fleet.

35 countries, including United States, Germany, and Australia, have demanded that Belarus and Russia be banned from the 2024 Paris Olympics due to the war in Ukraine. The IOC has suggested that athletes from these countries could compete as "neutrals". Ukraine will boycott the games if Russian athletes are allowed to compete.

Celeste Wallander, United States Assistant Secretary of Defense for International Security Affairs, estimates that Russia has "likely" lost half of its main battle tanks, although Russia is adapting to these losses.

The Zatoka Bridge, in which it crosses the Dniester Estuary, was struck by "marine unmanned drones" according to Russian and Ukrainian media. It was filled with explosives, and footage released shows an explosion. The amount of damage inflicted hasn't been released.

12 February
Ukrainian data indicates that Russian soldiers are suffering their highest losses since the first week of the war, at 824 soldiers killed per day in February. The UK Ministry of Defence has said that the data is "likely accurate". In June and July only around 172 Russian soldiers were killed per day. Ukraine is suffering a high attritional rate as well. 

The Wagner Group captured the village of Krasna Hora north of Bakhmut.

The United States embassy in Moscow has advised all American citizens to immediately depart Russia due to the ongoing war in Ukraine, citing the "risk of wrongful detentions".

13 February
Thomas Bach, head of the IOC, has stood by the offer of allowing Russian and Belarusian athletes to participate under a white or neutral flag for the 2024 Paris Olympics, saying that national governments should not decide who can participate in sports competitions.

It was reported that Pakistan had sent some 10,000 Grad rockets to Ukraine in February.

14 February
Ukrainian soldiers started training on Leopard 2 tanks in Poland. Norway announced that it would send eight Leopard 2 tanks to Ukraine.

20 February
US President Joe Biden visited Kyiv, where he promised more military and financial support.

21 February
Putin took Russia out of the New START treaty, accusing "the West" of being directly involved in attacking Russia's strategic air bases.

23 February
The Russian Ministry of Defense claimed that Ukraine was preparing to invade Transnistria and that Russian soldiers there would respond accordingly. Moldovan authorities pushed back against these claims.

24 February

German-made Leopard tanks from Warsaw arrived in Ukraine as Polish Prime Minister Mateusz Morawiecki visited Kyiv to send a "clear and measurable signal of further support".

The United States authorized $2 billion in aid to Ukraine, and ramped up sanctions and tariffs on Russia. The weapons package announced by the Defense Department included funding for contracts for HIMARS rockets, drones and counter-drone equipment, mine-clearing devices, 155-millimeter artillery ammunition and secure lines of communication.

China has proposed a peace plan which involves a ceasefire and multiple other steps that would result in direct negotiations. China holds the stance about "countries' sovereignty, independence and territorial integrity be effectively guaranteed" and that the "cold war mentality" should end. U.S. officials such as Biden and Blinken have expressed doubts about the plan, because China does not seem to be neutral, because they have yet to condemn the invasion. Zelenskyy has stated that it's good that China is talking about Ukraine, but that he'll cautiously await details on the plan. It is also speculated by some experts that depending on how this turns out, China could also turn around and start supplying Russia with military equipment.

26 February
According to a Russian source, border clashes between Belarus and Ukraine resulted in the death of one Belarusian soldier.

A Russian Beriev A-50U plane at the Machulishchy air base was said to have been destroyed by Belarusian partisans.  However, satellite imagery of the Machulishchy air base from 28 February showed the sole A-50 located there still largely intact.

27 February
Russia announced the creation of the Bohdan Khmelnytsky Battalion composed mostly of Ukrainian prisoners of war.  Sending prisoners of war into a combat zone would be a violation of the Geneva conventions.

March 2023

1 March
Russia repelled a massive drone attack on Crimea but Ukraine denied the same.

2 March
Russian authorities stated that an attack had occurred on two of their villages near Ukraine, in the Bryansk Oblast. Ukraine denied involvement, calling it a provocation.

4 March
Ukrainian forces began their withdrawal from Bakhmut and reports stated that many civilians fled from the city.

Rheinmetall, a German military vehicle and weapons manufacturing company, is reported to be negotiating with the government of Ukraine about the possibility of building a tank factory in Ukraine. The proposed factory would cost about 200 million euros and be capable of producing up to 400 Panther KF51 tanks per year. Armin Papperger, the CEO, reportedly argues that Ukraine would need about 600 to 800 new tanks to win the war, which is more than the 300 existing tanks that Germany could supply them with.

The Ukrainian Defence Minister, Oleksiy Reznikov, wrote a letter to the European Union asking for 250,000 155mm shells per month. Ukrainian forces use approximately 110,000 155mm shells per month. He claimed that Ukrainian forces are only firing a fifth of what they could due to shortages. The Ukrainian hope is to use "594,000" shells per month. NATO is considering establishing factories in Eastern Europe to increase production of Soviet era ammunition.

5 March
Two Ukrainian pilots are in the United States to see how long it would take them to learn how to fly attack aircraft including the F-16. Another 10 pilots have been approved for similar testing in the United States but they are yet to arrive.

Ukrainian Defense Minister Oleksii Reznikov claimed Russian losses were up to 500 wounded and killed every day.

8 March
EU ministers of defense agreed to purchase 1 billion euros worth of new shells and provide another 1 billion euros worth of existing materials. Manufacturers need larger orders to be financially secure enough to build new factories; new orders of artillery ammunition could take 2-3 years if produced using only the current factories. 

The US government was considering sending AIM-120 missiles to arm the Ukrainian Air Force's MiG-29 and Su-27.

9 March

Russian launched around 81 missiles, including 6 kinzhal missiles and 8 drones at Ukraine cities. Ukraine's Military stated it shot down 34 missiles and 4 Shahed drones. Around nine people have been killed and blackouts were reported in Ukraine cities. The Zaporizhzhia nuclear power plant was briefly cut off from the Ukrainian electrical grid, leaving it running on backup diesel generators for the sixth time since Russian forces seized control of it 12 months ago. Russia stated that the attack was response to the 2023 Bryansk Oblast attack.

The Head of Lithuanian military intelligence Elegijus Paulavicius, said in an interview that Russia has the resources to continue the war in Ukraine for at least two years at the "current intensity". He also dismissed the effect of sanctions as Russia has "long chains of intermediaries" to obtain Western technology.

Western officials estimate between 20,000 and 30,000 Russian soldiers have been killed or wounded in the fighting around Bakhmut, while Ukrainian forces have lost about one fifth as many.  These numbers cannot be verified.

11 March
Ukraine and Russia stated that hundreds of troops from each side were killed over 24 hours at Bakhmut.

13 March
Norway announced that it will provide two NASAMS missile system to Ukraine.

15 March

Ukroboronprom, with the help of a "NATO country", has started manufacturing 125 mm smoothbore ammunition for Ukraine's Soviet-era tanks. Also being manufactured are 120 mm mortar rounds, 122 mm and 152 mm artillery shells. The production of projectiles is completely dispersed over a large number of cities. This is part of a larger effort by Ukraine to manufacture ammunition as Western donors have reached into their own stockpiles.

16 March
Poland announced that it will provide four MiG-29s to Ukraine with in the next few days. The rest of Poland's MiG-29 fleet is being serviced to also be ready for transfer at a later time. The total number to be sent is unclear with different sources speculating from 11 to all of them.

17 March
Slovakia decided to provide Ukraine with 13 MiG-29s. The jets are in varying states of readiness.

The International Criminal Court issued an arrest warrant against President Putin for allegations of War crimes during Ukraine war.

18 March
President Putin visited Crimea on the ninth anniversary of the peninsula's annexation.
	
The Black Sea Grain Initiative between Ukraine and Russia, which was due to expire on 18 March, was extended.

19 March
	
President Putin toured Mariupol after travelling there from Crimea via helicopter.

20 March

The European Union announced that it will be sending a million rounds of shells to Ukraine.

See also
Outline of the Russo-Ukrainian War
Bibliography of Ukrainian history

References

Timelines of the 2022 Russian invasion of Ukraine
2022 timelines
Political timelines of the 2020s by year
Russo-Ukrainian War
Timelines of military conflicts since 1945
Timelines of the Russo-Ukrainian War
War crimes during the 2022 Russian invasion of Ukraine